is a passenger railway station located in the city of Fukaya, Saitama, Japan, operated by the East Japan Railway Company (JR East).

Lines
Fukaya Station is served by the Takasaki Line, with through Shōnan-Shinjuku Line and Ueno-Tokyo Line services to and from the Tōkaidō Main Line.

Layout
The station has one side platform and one island platform serving three tracks, connected by a footbridge, with an elevated station building located above the platforms. The station has a "Midori no Madoguchi" staffed ticket office.

Platforms

History 
The station opened on 21 October 1883. The station became part of the JR East network after the privatization of the JNR on 1 April 1987. A new station building modeled after Tokyo Station was completed in August 1996, with its brick built by Japan Brick Company. Bricks used in the Marunouchi side of the Tokyo Station building are produced by this company.

Passenger statistics
In fiscal 2019, the station was used by an average of 10,013 passengers daily (boarding passengers only).

Surrounding area
Karasawa River
Fukaya City Hall
Fukaya Post Office

See also
List of railway stations in Japan

References

External links

 JR East Station Information

Railway stations in Japan opened in 1883
Railway stations in Saitama Prefecture
Stations of East Japan Railway Company
Takasaki Line
Shōnan-Shinjuku Line
Fukaya, Saitama